Olga Sergeyevna Antonova (born December 22, 1937) is a Soviet and Russian film and stage actress. People's Artist of Russia (1994).

Selected filmography 
 An Almost Funny Story (1977) as Illaria Pavlovna
 The Asthenic Syndrome (1989) as Natalia Ivanovna
 The Assassin of the Tsar (1991) as Empress Alexandra
 Presence (1992) as Natalia
 The Castle (1994) as Innkeeper
 The Captain's Daughter (2000) as Catherine the Great
 Streets of Broken Lights (2004) as Zoya Ivleva

References

External links

1937 births
20th-century Russian actresses
21st-century Russian actresses
Living people
Actresses from Saint Petersburg
Honored Artists of the RSFSR
People's Artists of Russia
Recipients of the Order of Honour (Russia)
Russian film actresses
Russian stage actresses
Russian television actresses
Soviet film actresses
Soviet stage actresses
Soviet television actresses